The William McKinley Presidential Library and Museum is the presidential library of 25th U.S. president William McKinley. The library, which is located at the foot of the McKinley National Memorial, is owned and operated by the Stark County Historical Society, and located in Canton, Ohio, where McKinley built his career as lawyer, prosecuting attorney, congressman, governor and president.

The museum contains the largest collection of McKinley artifacts in the world and chronicles the life and career of the 25th president, from his birth to his death at the hands of an assassin. Another exhibit also explores the construction of the Memorial and the unfortunate fate of the McKinley’s Canton home, destroyed by fire in 1937.

As for the Museum itself it boasts a science center with some wildlife and fossils. The museum has a temporary exhibit space called the Keller gallery. The museum also has an planetarium show. Because of the science center, the museum has a membership plan that lets the member access other museums meeting the same criteria throughout the United States. The museum also houses other artifacts on the surrounding city.

The museum largely relies on volunteer staff for its operations. The current curator is Kimberly Kenney.

Hoover-Price Planetarium 

The Hoover-Price Planetarium was built during 1962, opened in July 1963, and stands adjacent to the McKinley National Memorial in Canton, Ohio. The Planetarium is housed within the McKinley Presidential Library & Museum.

The primary influence in the design and development of the planetarium was Richard Emmons (1919-2005), senior engineer in the Astronautics Department at Goodyear Aircraft Corporation, and past program director and lecturer at Morehead Planetarium in Chapel Hill, North Carolina. Asteroid 5391 Emmons (1985 RE2) was named in Emmons honor.

The central opto-mechanical star projector, a Spitz Model A-3-P, was enhanced by Emmons to show an additional 1,500 stars. Except for the dome and the sound system, all of the original equipment was purchased from Spitz Laboratories. The dome was made and installed by Astro-Dome, Inc., of Canton. It measures 7.2 meters in diameter and is made of aluminum structural beams covered by a perforated aluminum screen. The planetarium has 60 auxiliary projectors, including solar and lunar eclipses, meteors, life cycle of stars, double stars, Aurora Borealis, rainbows, the Milky Way galaxy, views of the moon and sunrise and sunset.

The construction of the planetarium was and remains privately funded. It is named after the two families whose donations made the project possible, the Hoover family and company and Mr. and Mrs. Harley C. Price. The planetarium has undergone few changes since 1964, except for the addition of two DLP projectors and a computer to generate images. Richard Emmons' son, Thomas Emmons, Emeritus Professor at Kent State’s Physics Department, continues to maintain the planetarium. The current director is David L. Richards, with a part-time staff of four program lecturers. All programming is accomplished in-house.

Ramsayer Research Library
The presidential archive itself is called the "Ramsayer Research Library" and is located in the South Wing of the building.

See also 

 National McKinley Birthplace Memorial
 McKinley National Memorial
 McKinley Birthplace Home and Research Center

External links 
 William McKinley Presidential Library and Museum

Buildings and structures in Canton, Ohio
Libraries in Ohio
Museums in Stark County, Ohio
Presidential libraries
Presidential museums in Ohio
William McKinley
Tourist attractions in Canton, Ohio